Bakary Nimaga (born 6 December 1994) is a Malian professional footballer who plays as a defensive midfielder for Austrian club Rheindorf Altach.

Club career

Early career
Nimaga was born in Douala, Cameroon to Malian parents who were working in Cameroon at the time of his birth, but they soon moved back to Mali during Bakary's childhood, where he grew up with his three brothers and four sisters. He helped his uncle at a local market in order to aid his family financially and to also fund his passion for football, as he was part of the Stade Malien academy. At the age of 15 he moved to South Africa to join a youth academy there with the help of a German couple who he had met in Mali, before moving to the Netherlands to join the FC Twente academy. He soon left the club and went on to live in Germany before returning to Mali.

Skënderbeu Korçë
Nimaga's agent was in contact with Albanian champions Skënderbeu Korçë prior to his move to the club, and was convinced by the club's official to return to Europe where he signed his first professional contract in the closing stages of the 2013 January transfer window, which was two-year deal ending on 31 December 2015. He featured in 5 league and 2 Albanian Cup games, helping his side win the Albanian Superliga championship for a third consecutive year.

On 17 August 2014, Nimaga scored the only goal in the 2014 Albanian Supercup against Flamurtari Vlorë at Qemal Stafa Stadium, giving the club their only second Supercup trophy. He scored in the beginning of the second half after a cross from the captain Bledi Shkëmbi.

Later, on 25 January of the following year, he scored the first league goal with the club, scoring the fourth during the 4–1 away win against Elbasani at Elbasan Arena, in the first match of the third phase. Nimaga played his 50th match on 2 May 2015, entering in the field in the last 15 minutes during the 4–2 home win against Teuta Durres. He ended his third season with 32 appearances and 5 goals in all competitions, with Skënderbeu Korçë by winning again the Albanian Superliga for a record fifth time, also reaching the semi-finals of Albanian Cup.

On 14 July 2015, in the first leg of second qualifying round of 2015–16 UEFA Champions League against Crusaders, Nimaga scored the opening goal in the 15th minute for a 4–1 victory. That was his first European goal in his six appearances in European competitions.

On 5 November 2015, Nimaga scored a fantastic goal from 40 yards in the 2015–16 UEFA Europa League group stage match against Sporting as teammate Peter Olayinka forced the Sporting goalkeeper Marcelo Boeck into a mistake and Nimaga himself capitalised on woeful defending to score from 40 yards as Skënderbeu recorded a 3–0 win against the Portuguese side at the Elbasan Arena, which was their first ever win at the group stage in any major tournament. During the 2015–16 season, Nimaga collected 30 appearances in all competitions, making only 15 league appearances, six of them as a starter, scoring three times in the process.

He started the 2016–17 season on 5 October by scoring four goals in the returning leg of 2016–17 Albanian Cup first round against Butrinti Sarandë, helping the team to win 8–0 and to progress to the next round with the aggregate 9–1. Later on 13th, Nimaga scored his first league goal, a 94th-minute winner against Teuta Durrës in the matchday 6 to help Skënderbeu maintain its 100% winning record.

Rheindorf Altach
On 28 January 2022, Nimaga returned to Austria and signed a one-and-a-half-year contract with Rheindorf Altach.

International career
He was named in the Mali U-20 squad for the 2013 FIFA U-20 World Cup held in Turkey, where he featured in all 3 group games, drawing two and losing one to finish bottom of Group D.

He can represent either Cameroon or Mali.

Career statistics

Club

Honours
Skënderbeu Korçë
 Albanian Superliga: 2012–13, 2013–14, 2014–15, 2015–16
 Albanian Supercup: 2013, 2014

References

External links

1994 births
Footballers from Douala
Living people
Malian footballers
Association football midfielders
Mali under-20 international footballers
Cameroonian footballers
Cameroonian people of Malian descent
KF Skënderbeu Korçë players
Hatayspor footballers
TSV Hartberg players
Zalaegerszegi TE players
SC Rheindorf Altach players
Kategoria Superiore players
TFF First League players
Austrian Football Bundesliga players
Nemzeti Bajnokság I players
Malian expatriate footballers
Expatriate footballers in Albania
Malian expatriate sportspeople in Albania
Expatriate footballers in Turkey
Malian expatriate sportspeople in Turkey
Expatriate footballers in Austria
Malian expatriate sportspeople in Austria
Expatriate footballers in Hungary
Malian expatriate sportspeople in Hungary